Prajakta Mali (born 8 August 1989) is an Indian actress known for her work in Marathi film and television. She was born in Pandharpur and brought up in Pune. She started her career with Star Pravah's Suvasini in 2011. Later, she appeared in Zee Marathi's Julun Yeti Reshimgathi in 2013. Currently she is hosting Sony Marathi's Maharashtrachi Hasyajatra.

Early life
She studied B.A. and M.A. in Performing Arts in “Bharatnatyam” at Lalit Kala Kendra, Pune University. She was also awarded a scholarship by the Ministry of Culture for higher studies in Bharatnatyam.

Career 

Prajakta was seen in Marathi television Star Pravah show "Suvasini" in the year 2011.  She was later seen playing the role of Meghna Desai in Zee Marathi's show Julun Yeti Reshimgathi in the year 2013.
She was also seen in the Kedar Shinde’s Marathi feature film "Kho-Kho" in the year 2013.

In 2014, she played the role of Bijli in the Marathi film Sangharsh starring Rajesh Shringarpure. Next, in 2017 she was seen as Girija in Hampi along with Sonalee Kulkarni.She is seen in the September 2017 movie Party, opposite Suvrat Joshi.
She hosted Marathi television shows Maharashtrachi Hasya Jatra for Sony Marathi from 2018 to 2020 and Mast Maharashtra travel show in the year 2020 for Zee Marathi.

Filmography

Films
All films are in Marathi, unless otherwise noted the language.

Television

References

External links 
 
 

Living people
1989 births
Indian film actresses
Actresses in Marathi cinema
21st-century Indian actresses
Indian television actresses
Actresses in Marathi television
Savitribai Phule Pune University alumni